The 1926 Temple Owls football team was an American football team that represented Temple University as an independent during the 1926 college football season. In its second season under head coach Heinie Miller, the team compiled a 5–3 record. The team played its home games on a new field located at City Line and Vernon Road; it was known variously as Temple Field, Owl Field, or the Temple athletic field.

Schedule

Notes

References

Temple
Temple Owls football seasons
Temple Owls football